Jeremy Dale Unertl (born September 15, 1978) is a former gridiron football safety. He was signed by the Green Bay Packers as an undrafted free agent in 2002. He had a 10-year professional career in multiple leagues. He played college football at Wisconsin–La Crosse. Unertl was also a member of the Baltimore Ravens, Las Vegas Gladiators, Columbus Destroyers, Chicago Rush, California Redwoods, Spokane Shock and Toronto Argonauts.

Professional career

First stint with Packers
After going undrafted in the 2002 NFL Draft, Unertl was signed by the Green Bay Packers as an undrafted free agent.

Baltimore Ravens
Unertl was signed by the Baltimore Ravens on August 12, but released at the end of training camp.

Second stint with Packers
Unertl was re-signed by the Green Bay Packers in the 2003 offseason and was allocated to NFL Europe, where he played for the Frankfurt Galaxy. He was released by the Packers on August 29.

Las Vegas Gladiators
Unertl then signed with the Las Vegas Gladiators in 2004, but was released during the 2005 season.

Columbus Destroyers
Unertl was claimed off waivers by the Columbus Destroyers in 2005. In 2006, he was traded to the Chicago Rush after week 2 for Henry Douglas.

Chicago Rush
Unertl immediately became the Rush's starting Defensive Specialist and had a breakout season. He helped Chicago to a three-game winning streak and was named defensive player of the game in all three games. He finished the season as the team's MVP, finishing the year as the Rush's leader in tackles, interceptions, and pass breakups.

California Redwoods
Unertl was drafted by the California Redwoods of the United Football League in the UFL Premiere Season Draft in 2009. He signed with the team on August 18.

Toronto Argonauts
On April 6, 2010, Unertl signed with the Toronto Argonauts of the Canadian Football League.

Personal life
Unertl married Kasie Cantor on May 11, 2012, in Las Vegas, Nevada.

References

External links
Arena Football League bio 
Just Sports Stats

People from Hartford, Wisconsin
Players of American football from Wisconsin
American football safeties
Wisconsin–La Crosse Eagles football players
Baltimore Ravens players
Frankfurt Galaxy players
Las Vegas Gladiators players
Columbus Destroyers players
Chicago Rush players
Sacramento Mountain Lions players
1978 births
Living people
Toronto Argonauts players
Spokane Shock players
Canadian football defensive backs
American players of Canadian football
Green Bay Packers players